Our Gap-soon is a 2016–2017 South Korean television series starring Kim So-eun and Song Jae-rim. This is the first time that a virtual couple from MBC's We Got Married co-stars as main cast in a serial drama on a national Korean television network. It aired on SBS every Saturdays to Sundays at 20:45 (KST) from August 27 to October 30, 2016, and then 2 episodes every Saturday from November 5, 2016 to April 8, 2017. This change generated a rating increase that led to an 11-episode extension, making the series end with 61 episodes.

Cast

Main cast
Kim So-eun as Shin Gap-soon (29-year-old)
Song Jae-rim as Heo Gap-dol (29-year-old)

Gap-soon's family
Jang Yong as Shin Joong-nyeon (63-year-old, Gap-soon's father)
Go Doo-shim as In Nae-shim (63-year-old, Gap-soon's mother)
Lee Mi-young as Shin Mal-nyeon (Joong-nyeon's younger sister)

Gap-dol's family
Lee Bo-hee as Nam Gi-ja (58-year-old, Gap-dol's mother)
Kim Gyu-ri as Heo Da-hae (36-year-old, Gap-dol's elder sister)

Shin Jae-soon's family
Yoo Sun as Shin Jae-soon (39-year-old, Gap-soon's elder sister)
Choi Dae-chul as Jo Geum-sik (42-year-old, Jae-soon's husband)
 as Jo Ah-young (36-year-old, Geum-sik's younger sister)
Park Seo-yeon as Jo Cho-rong (Geum-sik and Da-hae's elder daughter)
Seo Ga-eun as child Cho-rong (Cameo, episode 7)
Uhm Seo-hyun as Jo Da-rong (Geum-sik and Da-hae's younger daughter)
Lee Seung-woo as Jeon Ddol (Jae-soon and Se-bang's son)

Shin Se-gye's family
Lee Wan as Shin Se-gye (32-year-old, Gap-soon's elder brother)
Jang Da-yoon as Yeo Gong-joo (24-year-old, Se-gye's wife)
Kim Hyeseon as Yeo Shi-nae (49-year-old, Gong-joo's mother)
 as Yeo Bong (70-year-old, Shi-nae's father)

Geum Do-geum's family
Lee Byung-joon as Geum Do-geum (58-year-old)
 as young Do-geum
Seo Kang-seok as Geum Soo-jo (27-year-old)

Extended cast
Yoo Se-rye as Jung Man-joo (Se-gye's colleague and former schoolmate)
 as Bong Sam-sik (Do-geum's best friend)
Han Do-woo as Choi Ha-soo
Jung Chan as Jeon Se-bang (Jae-soon's former husband and Ddol's biological father)
Lee Ye-young as Shalala
Yoon Ji-on as Student part timer
Go Young-min as Bae Dal-tong (Gap-dol's best friend)
 as Nae-shim's friend
 as real estate agent

Ah Young as Kim Young-ran (Gap-dol's colleague)
Kim Jeong-hwan as Go Dal-pa
 as Ban Ji-ah

Lee Seung-joon as snooper
Kim Jong-ho as convenience store owner

Ratings
In the table below, the blue numbers represent the lowest ratings and the red numbers represent the highest ratings.

Original soundtrack

OST Part 1

OST Part 2

OST Part 3

OST Part 4

OST Part 5

OST Part 6

OST Part 7

OST Part 8

OST Part 9

OST Part 10

OST Part 11

OST Part 12

OST Part 13

OST Part 14

OST Part 15

OST Part 16

OST Part 17

OST Part 18

OST Part 19

OST Part 20

OST Part 21

OST Part 22

Production
Our Gap-soon is helmed by  who was the director of many SBS dramas such as Only You (2005), Lobbyist (2007), Star's Lover (2008), My Girlfriend Is a Gumiho (2010), Jang Ok-jung, Living by Love (2013), The Heirs (2013) and Mask (2015).

First script reading took place on August 2, 2016.

Awards and nominations

Notes

References

External links
 

Our Gap-soon at Daum 
Our Gap-soon at Naver Movies 

2016 South Korean television series debuts
2017 South Korean television series endings
Seoul Broadcasting System television dramas
Korean-language television shows
South Korean romantic comedy television series
Television series by Chorokbaem Media
Television series by Kim Jong-hak Production